The Shawnee Friends Mission is a historic Quaker mission and meeting house south of Shawnee, Oklahoma. It was built around 1880 and added to the National Register of Historic Places in 1973.

Mission work by the Society of Friends began around 1871.  The Friends Meeting House, built was built around 1880 and survives in good condition in 1972.

References

Churches in Oklahoma
Churches on the National Register of Historic Places in Oklahoma
Churches completed in 1924
Buildings and structures in Pottawatomie County, Oklahoma
National Register of Historic Places in Pottawatomie County, Oklahoma